Luke Anthony Adams (born 8 May 1994) is a New Zealand international footballer who plays as a defender.

Career
In 2012, Adams joined the English club Derby County F.C. on a one-year contract.
In 2013, Adams signed a one-year contract with Wellington Phoenix.
In May 2014, Adams was called into the All Whites squad for a 30 May friendly in Auckland against South Africa by interim coach Neil Emblen.
In September 2014, Adams returned to Waitakere United.
In January 2015, Adams signed with Australian football club South Melbourne FC.

In December 2017, Adams signed with Ljungskile SK in Division 1 Södra, the Swedish third tier. He left the club after only a few months, due to personal reasons, failing to make a single league appearance.

International career
After representing various New Zealand youth teams, including at the 2011 U-17 World Cup and the 2013 U-20 World Cup, Adams was a member of the New Zealand U-23s squad at the 2015 Pacific Games.

He made his debut for the senior New Zealand national football team in a 2016 OFC Nations Cup 3–1 win over Fiji.

In June 2016, Adams scored the winner in a 1–0 win over the Solomon Islands. The match was a World Cup qualifier.

Career statistics

International goals
As of match played 4 June 2016. New Zealand score listed first, score column indicates score after each Adams goal.

Honours

Club
South Melbourne
 National Premier Leagues Victoria Championship: 2016
 National Premier Leagues Victoria Premiership : 2015
 Dockerty Cup: 2015

Country
New Zealand
 OFC Nations Cup: 2016
 OFC U-20 Championship: 2013
 OFC U-17 Championship: 2011

References

1994 births
Living people
New Zealand youth international footballers
Waitakere United players
Wellington Phoenix FC players
South Melbourne FC players
Ljungskile SK players
Soccer players from Melbourne
Association football central defenders
2016 OFC Nations Cup players
A-League Men players
National Premier Leagues players
Expatriate soccer players in Australia
New Zealand expatriate sportspeople in Australia
New Zealand association footballers
New Zealand international footballers
New Zealand under-20 international footballers
New Zealand expatriate sportspeople in England
New Zealand expatriate sportspeople in Sweden
Expatriate footballers in Sweden
Derby County F.C. players
Expatriate footballers in England
Australian emigrants to New Zealand